Avanim is Raphael Nadjari's fourth feature film. It was shot in and around Tel Aviv in 2003, in HDCam. The film was presented in the Berlin Film Festival as a Panorama: Special presentation in 2004.

Plot
Michale is a woman in her mid-30s, married with a young son and working in her father's Tel Aviv accounting firm serving religious institutions. She divides her time between her child, her husband, her work and the man with whom she is having an affair. When Michale learns of the sudden death of her lover, her life is shattered.

Cast
 Asi Levi (Michale)  
 Uri Gavriel (Meir)
 Florence Bloch (Nehama Tinski)
 Shaul Mizrahi (Gabai)
 Danny Steg (Shmoulik)
 Gabi Amrani-Gur (Rav Ozeri)
 Eli Eltonyo (Gabriel)

Release
Following its premiere as a Panorama Special presentation at the Berlin Film Festival, Avanim premiered in New York at the Museum of Modern Art (MoMA) and was released theatrically in France later that year.

Awards and nominations
Berlin Film Festival (2004) - Panorama
Cinema Tout Ecran (Geneva) - Winner, Best Film
Seville European Film Festival - Winner, Golden Giraldillo to Best Film
France Culture - Winner, Director of the Year
European Film Awards - Nominee, Best Actress (Asi Levi)

References

External links
 
 LA Film review
 Review from the Berlin Film Festival

2004 films
Films directed by Raphael Nadjari
2000s Hebrew-language films
French independent films
Israeli drama films
Films scored by Nathaniel Méchaly
French drama films
American drama films
2000s American films
2000s French films